Super J-Cup 2020 was the eighth Super J-Cup professional wrestling single-elimination tournament produced by New Japan Pro-Wrestling (NJPW). It was a one-night event, taking place on December 12, 2020. The tournament featured inter-promotional matches between junior heavyweight wrestlers from various wrestling promotions.

Background 
During the Road to Power Struggle show on November 2, 2020, NJPW announced that the Super J-Cup would return on December 12, and will take place entirely in the United States. Including 2019's Super J-Cup, this was the first time that the tournament is held in back-to-back years since 1994 & 1995.

Karl Fredericks was originally scheduled to team with Ren Narita to face Hikuleo and Kenta of Bullet Club, but it was announced on December 12 that Fredericks sustained an unknown injury. Kevin Knight was announced as his replacement.

Participants 
The tournament featured 8 junior heavyweight wrestlers from various wrestling promotions.

Results

Tournament brackets

References 

 
New Japan Pro-Wrestling tournaments
New Japan Pro-Wrestling shows
International sports competitions hosted by Japan
WAR (wrestling promotion) events